José Félix Parra Cuerda (born 16 January 1997) is a Spanish cyclist, who currently rides for UCI ProTeam .

Major results
2019
 10th Overall Giro della Valle d'Aosta
2021
 1st  Overall Tour Alsace
1st Stage 4
 7th Overall Volta a Portugal
 9th Overall CRO Race

Grand Tour general classification results timeline

References

External links

1997 births
Living people
Spanish male cyclists
Sportspeople from the Province of Albacete
Cyclists from Castilla-La Mancha